John Henneberger is an advocate for affordable housing active in Austin, Texas. He is best known for his work reforming Texan housing laws and for aiding in the development of improved emergency housing. He was the recipient of a MacArthur Award in 2014.

Bibliography
Housing Patterns Study: Segregation and Discrimination in Austin, Texas (1979)

References

External links
Henneberger's Twitter

Living people
MacArthur Fellows
People from Austin, Texas
University of Texas at Austin alumni
Activists from Texas
Year of birth missing (living people)